Domkhar, also spelt Damkhar, is a village in Leh district of Ladakh in India. It is located in the Khalsi tehsil.

The Domkhar Rock Art Sanctuary was created in 2012 to preserve prehistoric petroglyphs in the area.

Demographics 
According to the 2011 census of India, Damkhar has 199 households. The effective literacy rate (i.e. the literacy rate of population excluding children aged 6 and below) is 62.22%.

References

Villages in Khalsi tehsil